Salvatore Marcello Rinella (born February 27, 1975, in Palermo) is a retired amateur Italian freestyle wrestler, who competed in the men's middleweight category. He won three bronze medals in the 69 and 74-kg division at the Mediterranean Games (1997, 2001, and 2005), and also represented his nation Italy at the 2004 Summer Olympics. Having worked as a police officer for Polizia di Stato, Rinella trained full-time for the wrestling squad at Gruppo Sportivo Fiamme Oro in Rome, under head coach Mauro Massaro.

Biography
Rinella qualified for the Italian squad in the men's 74 kg class at the 2004 Summer Olympics in Athens. Earlier in the process, Rinella received a ticket to the Olympics by defeating Tajikistan's Yusup Abdusalomov for a third spot at the Olympic Qualification Tournament in Sofia, Bulgaria. He easily ousted Australia's Ali Abdo in his opening match on technical superiority, but fell behind Belarus' Murad Haidarau by a 2–4 deficit at the end of the prelim pool. Finishing second in the pool and seventh overall, Rinella's performance was not enough to advance him to the quarterfinals.

In 2005, Rinella overcame his Olympic setback with a third career bronze medal in the same class at the Mediterranean Games in Almería, Spain. He also sought his bid for the 2008 Summer Olympics in Beijing, but failed to earn a spot from the Olympic Qualification Tournament, effectively ending his sporting career.

References

External links
 

1975 births
Living people
Olympic wrestlers of Italy
Wrestlers at the 2004 Summer Olympics
Sportspeople from Palermo
Italian male sport wrestlers
Mediterranean Games bronze medalists for Italy
Competitors at the 1997 Mediterranean Games
Competitors at the 2001 Mediterranean Games
Competitors at the 2005 Mediterranean Games
Mediterranean Games medalists in wrestling
Wrestlers of Fiamme Oro